The 20,000 metres (approximately 12.43 mi or 65,617 ft) is a rarely contested long-distance running event in track and field competitions; most world records in the event have been set during half marathons and one-hour races, as a half marathon is roughly 21,000 meters.

World Records 
+ = indicates a time was taken at an intermediate distance in a longer race

Men 
Updated February 2021.

Women 
 Correct as of August 2018.

All-time top 25
+ = en route to longer performance
h = hand timed

Men
Updated September 2022.

Women
Updated September 2022.

In popular culture 
Tegla Loroupe's 20,000 meter world record was mentioned in Chapter 1, problem 64P of Chemistry (Seventh Edition) by John E. McMurry, Robert C. Fay, and Jill Kirsten Robinson.

References 

Events in track and field
Long-distance running distances